The St. Louis County Police Department (SLCPD) is the primary and largest law enforcement agency serving St. Louis County in the U.S. state of Missouri. The current Chief of Police is Colonel  Kenneth Gregory. According to the Charter of St. Louis County, the county police chief has all of the criminal law enforcement duties of the sheriff of St. Louis County, except for the operation of the St. Louis County Jail, which is handled by the St. Louis County Department of Justice Services (civilian), court bailiff and service of civil process. Court bailiff/civil process duties are provided by a court-appointed sheriff and his employees, none of whom have law enforcement powers.

The St. Louis County Police Department is the Largest County police agency in Missouri, based on number of employees, county population, and geographic area served.

This change in law enforcement services occurred in 1955, when the St. Louis County Charter was amended by the voters to restrict the duties of the St. Louis County Sheriff's Office. The position of elected sheriff was eliminated. St. Louis County is one of two counties in Missouri that does not have an elected sheriff. With the charter amendment, all law enforcement services were assigned to a new police agency, the St. Louis County Police Department. The department is primarily responsible for law enforcement and investigations within unincorporated St. Louis County and contract municipalities, however, it has full police authority throughout the county, including its 88 municipalities which are also served by 58 local police departments, some of them very small. Additionally, St. Louis County police officers are authorized to enforce Missouri law in all counties in the state having a government of the first classification, which includes the independent City of St. Louis. Deputy Chief Kenneth Gregory was appointed to the position of Chief of Police on January 28, 2022 by the St. Louis County Board of Police Commissioners.

Departmental history
The St. Louis County Police Department was established in 1955. The department was created with 95 officers and 18 civilian employees. The department is divided into four divisions: Patrol, Operational Support, Special Operations, and Criminal Investigation. It is the third largest local police agency in the state and one of two county police departments in Missouri, the other being the St. Charles County Police Department. The SLCPD is accredited by the Commission on Accreditation for Law Enforcement Agencies. CALEA is the only international body that accredits law enforcement agencies. Only seven percent of all U.S. law enforcement agencies are accredited. In 2010, CALEA recognized the St. Louis County Police Department with it distinguished Tri-Arc Award. The Tri-Arc Award is reserved for those police agencies that have successfully accredited their law enforcement services, police academy and communications division. Only six agencies in the world have achieved this status.

Starting in October of 2018, the St. Louis County Police Department began patrolling Kinloch after it dissolved its city police department.

On October 25, 2019, a jury awarded $20 million to a police sergeant for discrimination by the St. Louis County Police Department.  Witnesses testified that police department leadership had said that the sergeant would never be promoted because he was "way too out there with his gayness and he needed to tone it down if he wanted a white shirt." (The command staff are called "white shirts" because of the color of their uniform shirts.) On October 27 County Executive Sam Page announced that "the time for leadership changes has come and change must start at the top" of the St. Louis County Police Department. After reaching the settlement, Chief Jon Belmar resigned from his position. It is unclear if insurance would cover the amount.

Fallen officers 
From October 4, 1871, to October 6, 2016, the Officer Down Memorial Page reported that 13 officers in the St. Louis County Police Department died in the line of duty,  5 of them from gunfire, 5 from automobile-related incidents, 1 from being stabbed, and 2 from heart attacks. Many families of those killed in the line of duty get support from BackStoppers, a local charity.

The causes of death are as follows:

Board of Police Commissioners
The St. Louis County Board of Police Commissioners is responsible for the operation of the department . The Board sets policy, makes promotions, holds both closed and open meetings and coordinates with the Chief of Police in providing police services to the citizens. Four of the five members of the board are selected by the County Executive of St. Louis County, following approval of the County Council, with the County Executive serving as the sixth member. As provided in the St. Louis County Charter, the St. Louis County Police Department operates under the control of a civilian board of commissioners appointed by the County Executive with the approval of a majority of the County Council. Commissioners serve overlapping three year terms.

As of 2021, the membership is: Board of Commissioners

Executive Command Staff
The Chief of Police serves as the senior sworn member of the SLCPD. Kenneth Gregory is the tenth individual to hold the post and first African-American Chief in SLCPD History. Prior to 1955 the position was known as the Superintendent of Police and was later changed to Chief of Police.

The Office of the Chief of Police is responsible for the planning, efficient administration and operation of the Police Department under the authority of the Board of Police Commissioners.

The Chief of Police reports directly to the Board of Police Commissioners.

The Office of the Chief of Police has seven units or bureaus:

 Chief of Police: Colonel Kenneth Gregory (appointed to the position of Chief of Police on January 28, 2022)
 Deputy Chief of Police: Lieutenant Colonel Bryan Ludwig
 Bureau of Professional Standards
 Police Contract Services
 Media Relations and Public Information
 Bureau of Research and Analysis
 Intelligence Operations Bureau

Chiefs of Police

Division of Patrol
The SLCPD is divided into eight police precincts, two of which are contracted cities, Fenton and Wildwood (5th and 6th). Each precinct's cars are issued plates with a letter corresponding to the assigned precinct. On November 1, 2010, the SLCPD took command of the City of Jennings Police Department under contract. The agency contracts with another 16 municipal governments to provide full-time police protection. Although the agency has full police authority of the sheriff in the entire county, including all municipalities, direct service population for the SLCPD is over 400,000 residents. A majority of these 400,000 residents are located in South St. Louis County and Affton, both of which are unincorporated but heavily populated and suburban. The division fields 33 School Resource Officers (SRO) to various school districts in the county. A volunteer Reserve Police Unit provides uniformed support to the division. The Division of Patrol is commanded by Lieutenant Colonel Juan Cox.

County Police Precincts
 1st- North County (Plates: A)
 2nd- Central County (Plates: B)
 3rd- Affton Southwest County (Plates: C)
 4th- South County (Plates: D)
 5th- City of Fenton (Plates: F)
 6th- City of Wildwood (Plates: G)
 7th- West County (Plates: H)
 8th - Jennings (Plates: J)

Vehicles marked with plates "T" are Tactical Unit vehicles or are used for the Tactical Unit; vehicles with plates "E" are for administration, D.A.R.E., K-9 Units, MetroLink, or other special non-patrol units.

Patrol Officers are issued the SIG Sauer P229R .40 semi-automatic pistol which replaced the Smith and Wesson 4006 .40 semi-automatic pistol in 2007. Detectives were issued the S&W 4013 .40 and the S&W 4014 .40, but now carry the SIG Sauer P229R .40 like the patrol officers.

Division of Special Operations

In 2004, the St. Louis County Police Department, the Metropolitan Police Department, City of St. Louis, and the St. Charles County Sheriff's Department joined together to share resources and created the Metro Air Support. Metro Air Support, as of January 1, 2020, boasts 5 helicopters, 1 fixed wing airplane, 10 pilots, 1 flight instructor, and 2 mechanics.

In addition to Metro Air Support, the Division of Special Operations staffs a full-time Tactical (SWAT) Unit consisting of 21 members, as well as nine K-9 Units trained to detect narcotics, locate missing persons and apprehend suspects. As a matter of policy, the department uses SWAT and police dogs to serve all felony warrants. Special Operations is also responsible for entrance security at the County Jail, Family Court and St. Louis County Courthouse in Clayton, Bureau of Tactical Operations, Special Response Unit, Metro Air Unit, Highway Safety Unit, MetroLink Police Unit, Crisis Intervention Team, and Office of the Chaplains. The Division of Special Operations is commanded by Lieutenant Colonel Troy Doyle.

Division of Criminal Investigations
The SLCPD has the largest investigative unit in the state. Nearly 200 detectives provide county-wide services for the crimes of homicide, child abuse, St. Louis Regional Bomb and Arson Unit, domestic violence, sexual assault, fugitive apprehension, auto theft, burglary, fraud, robbery, drug abuse, and child exploitation. The SLCPD also has a full-time ASCLAD-Lab accredited Crime Laboratory, Fingerprint Unit, Prisoner Conveyance Unit, Crime Scene Unit (CSI), Bureau of Drug Enforcement, and Polygraph Unit. The Division of Criminal Investigation is commanded by Lieutenant Colonel Steve Sack.

Division of Operational Support
The SLCPD provides a wide range of support services for the department and community which include the following:
 Bureau of Communications
 Emergency Communications Network
 Office of Emergency Management
 Bureau of Central Police Records

The Division is commanded by Lieutenant Colonel Gerald Lohr

Commissioned/sworn positions
The SLCPD uses the following ranks.

Officers with the power of arrest.

Professional staff (non-sworn) positions
 Professional any non-supervisory employee that is not commissioned.
 Supervisor Professional staff employee equal to rank or pay grade of commissioned Sergeant or Lieutenant
 Director Professional staff employee equal to rank or pay grade of commissioned Captain
 Executive Director Professional staff employee equal to rank or pay grade of commissioned Lieutenant Colonel

See also

 List of law enforcement agencies in Missouri

References

External links
 St. Louis County Police Department official website
 Commission on Accreditation for Law Enforcement Agencies, Inc. official website

County police departments of Missouri
Municipal police departments of Missouri
Government of St. Louis County, Missouri
1955 establishments in Missouri